Loxosceles devia, the Texas recluse, is a species of recluse spider in the family Sicariidae. It is found in the United States and Mexico.

References

Sicariidae
Articles created by Qbugbot
Spiders described in 1940